Lisa M. Shalett is an independent board director, angel investor and advisor to startups.

Background 
Shalett is a former Goldman Sachs partner, she worked at the firm for two decades and served as its Head of Brand Marketing and Digital Strategy during the financial crisis. She led the firm’s first corporate image advertising campaign called “Progress is Everyone’s Business.” Shalett was named one of the “Top 100 Most Inspiring Marketers” by The Internationalist in 2013, one of the “Top 50 Women in Brand Marketing”, and received the Trailblazer Award from Re:Gender in 2014. She has participated in the Fortune Most Powerful Women Summit, and is a frequent speaker and panelist.

References 

Living people
American venture capitalists
Digital marketing
Brand management
Harvard Business School alumni
Year of birth missing (living people)
Goldman Sachs people
American women investors
21st-century American businesswomen
21st-century American businesspeople
Angel investors